The Samsung S8300 (marketed as UltraTOUCH, also as Tocco Ultra) is a high-spec mobile phone model from Samsung Telecommunications, released over April 2009. Renowned for its AMOLED touch-screen display and 3x4 optional keypad input, The Samsung S8300 is acclaimed to be one of the better Samsung mobile phones to date. The phone has a vast array of features such as; an 8.0-megapixel camera with video recording (auto-focus, face detection and smile-shot) and an integrated music player.

Interface 
The S8300 is one of the first touch screen mobile phones that also features a slide out keypad. This allows users to interface with the phone by using the touchscreen to navigate the Touchwiz interface, as well as the fallback of an 'old-tech' keypad for software that either does not support the touchscreen, or for users that are not comfortable with the touch interface for phone calling and text entry. Having a slideout keypad also means that the screen is not obstructed with an onscreen keyboard/pad when entering text or other information into the phone.

Navigation 
The phone comes with a built in AGPS receiver which can be used for navigation, geotagging and other applications that require GPS location. Most releases of the phone come with Google Maps preinstalled, however several older firmware releases have been found that come with a Samsung Navigator installed. These firmware versions can be 'flashed' onto a device to provide access to this software. The custom OS on this phone appears to have a lack of support for any third party navigation applications with no providers listing support for the device. This is a severe limitation in the usability of this feature.

The Samsung Navigator that can be found in earlier firmware releases appears to be a version of Route 66 (V9) that has been altered to run on the Samsung TouchWiz UI operating system provided on the device. Once 'installed', maps are available free from the Route 66 store, however a 'subscription' of either 1 day, 30 days or 12 months needs to be purchased in order to use the navigation facilities in the software.

See also
Samsung F480 Tocco
Samsung U900 Soul
Samsung i8510 Innov8

References

Samsung mobile phones
Mobile phones introduced in 2009
Slider phones